Henn Pärn (born 1941) is an Estonian politician. He was a member of X Riigikogu.

He has been a member of Res Publica Party.

References

Living people
1941 births
Members of the Riigikogu, 2003–2007
Res Publica Party politicians
Place of birth missing (living people)
Date of birth missing (living people)